Teddy Tinmar (born 30 May 1987) is a French sprinter, who specialises in the 100 and 200 metres. He helped the French men's 4×100 metres relay team to win a silver medal at the 2011 World Championships.

Personal best

References

External links

FFA profile for Teddy Tinmar

1987 births
Living people
Sportspeople from Bondy
French male sprinters
World Athletics Championships medalists
European Athletics Championships medalists